"Seasons Change" is a pop–R&B song written and produced by Lewis Martineé for the American girl group Exposé's debut album, Exposure (1987). It was the group's fifth single released. The song's lyrics describe relationships fading away due to the changes brought about by time (on both people and events). It is the group's biggest hit to date. Angie Vollaro of fellow Lewis A. Martineé group Sequal lent background vocals to this song. Expose  was an 80's rarity as one of the only female vocal groups to hit #1. (Bananarama being the other group)

Reception
Released at the end of 1987 as the album's fifth single, the ballad remains the group's biggest hit to date, as it went to number one on the Adult Contemporary chart and topped the U.S. Billboard Hot 100 for one week on February 20, 1988. The single reached number 97 in the United Kingdom.

Track listings

Charts

Weekly charts

Year-end charts

References

Exposé (group) songs
1987 songs
1988 singles
Billboard Hot 100 number-one singles
Pop ballads
Contemporary R&B ballads
Songs written by Lewis Martineé
Arista Records singles